Axum is a solo album by American jazz flautist and composer James Newton recorded in 1981 and released on the ECM label.

Reception
The Allmusic review by Scott Yanow awarded the album 3 stars stating "James Newton's set of unaccompanied flute solos is generally more intriguing and diverse than one might expect. An expert at multiphonics (often humming through his flute in order to get more than one note at a time), Newton is also very strong at constructing logical yet utterly unpredictable improvisations. His playing on nine of his originals covers a fair amount of ground, and he alternates between three different types of flutes (his regular horn, alto flute and bass flute). Still, the results are more for specialized tastes".  Describing the album as “dazzling”, The Penguin Guide to Jazz Recordings says, “Newton’s vocalisations allow his pieces to develop with unprecedented depth, and his tone is quite remarkable.”

Track listing
All compositions by James Newton
 "The Dabtara" - 3:24 
 "Malak 'Uqabe" - 6:52 
 "Solomon, Chief of Wise Men" - 4:44 
 "Addis Ababa" - 2:56 
 "Choir" - 4:32 
 "Feeling" - 2:34 
 "Axum" - 4:18 
 "Susenyos and Werzelya" - 5:20 
 "The Neser" - 7:59
Recorded at Tonstudio Bauer in Ludwigsburg, West Germany in August 1981

Personnel
James Newton - flute, alto flute, bass flute

References

ECM Records albums
James Newton albums
Albums produced by Manfred Eicher
1982 albums